George Joseph O'Brien (November 4, 1889 – March 24, 1966) was an American professional baseball player and college sports coach and administrator. O'Brien later coached and served as athletic director at Mount Union College—now known as the University of Mount Union—in Alliance, Ohio.

Head coaching record

Football

References

External links
 

1889 births
1966 deaths
Major League Baseball catchers
St. Louis Browns players
Decatur Commodores players
Youngstown Steelmen players
Mount Union Purple Raiders athletic directors
Mount Union Purple Raiders football coaches
Mount Union Purple Raiders men's basketball coaches
Baseball players from Cleveland